The Line 2 of Wuhan Metro is the first underground metro line crossing the Yangtze River. This line has started trial run on September 25, 2012,
and has opened on December 28, 2012. It is Wuhan's second metro line after Line 1, and the city's first underground line, since Line 1 is mostly elevated. Line 2 runs in a northwest–southeast direction, connecting Hankou and Wuchang, including  and major commercial districts.

The number of single day passengers on Line 2 has exceeded 500,000 on Jan 1, 2013, the first weekday after its opening, excluding elders holding free passes. When more lines interchangeable with Line 2 open around 2015, the passenger volume could reach 1 million per day. To accommodate such huge traffic, all stations on Line 2 have been extended to the length of 8-car trains for future use.

Line 2 is an important metro line in the Wuhan Metro system for being able to carry the heavy cross-Yangtze traffic in Wuhan.

Overview
Length: 
Gauge: 
Stations: 38.
Double track: full line.
Electrified: full line.
Underground: full line.
Traffic direction: right-hand side.

History
Construction initially began on November 16, 2006 at Fanhu Station under a test-initiative program. and the National Development and Reform Commission approved all construction of the line on September 1, 2007.
The tunnels were completed on February 26, 2012,
and the line started revenue service on December 28, 2012.
It was extended to Wuhan Tianhe International Airport on December 28, 2016.
An extension of the line to the south in Donghu New Technology Development Zone is operating and was opened on February 19, 2019.

On the first day of the system's operations, 132,000 passengers were counted entering or exiting the system at the line's last station in Wuchang,  (Guanggu Guangchang). By the early 2013, the weekday daily ridership (entries + exits) at the same station was counted at 95,000. As of April 2013 the daily ridership of Line 2 averaged 383,600 people per day.

Stations

Change of Names 
On August 23, 2012, five stations were renamed according to the result of a poll.
Jinse Yayuan and Mingdu Stations were firstly named after nearby real estate development, and was subsequently renamed as "Changgang Road" and "Yangjiawan" respectively to avoid advertising for the development.
"Hankou Railway Station Station" has been renamed "Hankou Railway Station" to avoid unnecessary repetition and pronunciation challenges.
"Jia" in Pangxiejia has a homophone that tells the story of history as the site of Metro station was once a section of the ancient city walls of Wuchang that were built along the Pangxiejia ridge.
"Xiaoguishan" replaced Tiyu South Road (Tiyunanlu) to make the historical places more easily recognizable.

Paired Cross-Platform Transfer 

Hongshan Square station and Zhongnan Road station offer paired cross-platform interchange for passengers riding between 4 directions of the two lines. The configuration for the two stations is similar to that of Mong Kok and Prince Edward stations in Hong Kong's Mass Transit Railway.

Passengers riding on Line 2 from Hankou wishing to reach Wuchang railway station, can transfer at Zhongnan Road station by crossing the platform. Those who going to Wuhan railway station, can transfer at Hongshan Square station by crossing the platform, and vice versa.

Female Waiting Area 

Stations of Line 2 provides female only waiting area during hours of operation, following the example of Tokyo, Osaka, Nagoya, Tehran and Mexico City, to protect female riders from sexual harassment. Wuhan became the first city to set up female only waiting area in China.

Starbucks Metro Store 
China's first Starbucks Metro store is opened in Hongshan Square station.

Sale of Partial Naming Rights 
Partial naming rights of Jianghan Road station of this line was sold to a local snack producer, Zhouheiya (Zhou's dark duck), and has aroused public discontent with the Wuhan Metro Group company. Some are upset by the fact that Metro company sold the rights without public input; some are because the product is not of high taste, and might affect the image of the city; some think it is fine, for selling partial naming rights is a good way to attract funding from the private sector, and does not materially affect the quality of the service.

As of November 23, 2012, all sale of partial naming rights are canceled.

Rolling stock 

The rolling stock for Line 2 is currently 6-car trains, with  max speed,  operational max speed and  average running speed. The collection shoe is installed on the lower part of the vehicle. The third rail is a mix of steel and aluminum. A full train provides 176 seats, and can carry 1276 passengers by Chinese regulation of 9 people per square meter. In the future 8-car trains will be used.

See also 
Wuhan Metro
Wuhan

References

 
2012 establishments in China
Airport rail links in China